O'Hanlon Cup is a chess league in Ireland, it is the fourth division of the Leinster Leagues, run by the Leinster Chess Union. Originally it was the third division, but since the establishment in 1970 of the Heidenfeld Trophy as the second tier, the O'Hanlon became the fourth division. The trophy is named after the nine times Irish Chess Champion, John O'Hanlon and the trophy was used before the setting up of the league as a prize for chess in Connaught by the Irish Chess Union.
The top teams each year get promoted to the Ennis Shield and the bottom teams get demoted to the BEA Cup.

Winners
 1960 - Dun Laoghaire
 1961 - O'Hanlon Chess Club (the blind club)
 1969 - Rathmines
 1972 - Kevin Barry (divided into 2 sections Kevin Barry won play off with Kilkenny)
 1979 - Bray/Greystones
 1991 - Tallaght
 1992 - Curragh
 1997 - St. Benildus
 1998 - Public Service
 2000 - Aer Lingus
 2002 - Dublin University
 2004 - Jobstown
 2005 - Inchicore
 2006 - Aer Lingus
 2007 - Kilkenny
 2008 - Royal Lopez
 2009 - Finglas
 2010 - Rathmines
 2011 - Naomh Barróg A
 2012 - Cavan
 2013 - Drogheda 
 2014 - Ballinasloe
 2015 - Round Tower
 2016 - Gonzaga
 2017 - St. Benildus A
 2018 - Dublin University
 2019 - Gonzaga

References

Chess in Ireland
Chess competitions